Košarovci is a small village in the Municipality of Gornji Petrovci in the Prekmurje region of Slovenia.

References

External links
Košarovci on Geopedia

Populated places in the Municipality of Gornji Petrovci